San Miguel is one of the ten districts of the Misiones Department in Paraguay. San Miguel is known as the Wool Capital.

Geography 

San Miguel is located 178 km south from Asunción, the capital city of Paraguay. it is reached by Route Number 1 from Asuncion.

Sources 
World Gazeteer: Paraguay – World-Gazetteer.com

Populated places in the Misiones Department